Wilson Reservoir is a man-made lake in Elko County, Nevada in the United States. The reservoir was initially created in 1954 by the construction of Wilson Reservoir Dam. The Petan Ranch owns the reservoir, water rights, and a cabin, but public land surrounding the reservoir is administered by the Bureau of Land Management. The reservoir impounds the Wilson Creek for irrigation storage. It is located 83 miles north-northwest of Elko.

See also
List of dams in the Columbia River watershed

References 

Dams in Nevada
Reservoirs in Nevada
Buildings and structures in Elko County, Nevada
Dams completed in 1954
Lakes of Elko County, Nevada
1954 establishments in Nevada